Mob or MOB may refer to:

Behavioral phenomena
 Crowd
 Smart mob, a temporary self-structuring social organization, coordinated through telecommunication

Crime and law enforcement
 American Mafia, also known as the Mob
 Irish Mob, a US criminal syndicate
 A mob, in organized crime 
 MOB, Member of Bloods, a member of the Bloods street gang
 A group of vigilantes

 Other criminal organizations sometimes referred to as a "mob" include: 
 Jewish mob
 Polish mob
 Japanese mob 
 Russian mob
 Greek Mob (disambiguation)
 Black Mafia or Muslim Mob
 State Line Mob
 Armenian Mob
 Albanian mafia or Albanian Mob
 Serbian mafia or Serbian Mob
 Romanian mafia or Romanian Mob
 Bulgarian mafia or Bulgarian Mob

Other uses
 Mob, a family group, clan group or wider Aboriginal community group in Australian Aboriginal English
 Mob, collective noun for a group of macropods
 Mob (slamball team), a SlamBall team based in Chicago
 Mob (video games), a term for non-player characters
 Shigeo Kageyama, nicknamed "Mob", protagonist of the manga and anime Mob Psycho 100
 Mob as in a team of 100 contestants playing against a single contestant in a game show Eén tegen 100 (also known as  1 vs. 100)

As an abbreviation

Transportation
 Man overboard, a person who has fallen off a boat or ship and is in need of rescue
 Mobile Regional Airport (IATA airport code), located in Mobile, Alabama
 Montreux-Oberland Bernois, Swiss narrow gauge railway (1000mm)
 Motos Operacionais de Bombeiros, motorcycles used as ambulances in Brazil

Others
 Magyar Olimpiai Bizottság, National Olympic Committee of Hungary
 Main Operating Base, an overseas, permanently manned, well protected military base
 Marching Owl Band, the Rice University "marching band"
 Mobile offshore base, a concept for supporting military operations where conventional land bases are not available
 MobileCoin, a cryptocurrency
 Mob (gaming), a monster or non-player character in a computer game, short for "mobile"
 Movable object block, used in computer graphics
 M.O.B.: The Album, a 2008 album by ByrdGang
 M.O.B. (Project Pat album), 2017
 "M.O.B.", a song by Tupac Shakur from the 2001 album Until the End of Time

See also
 The Mob (disambiguation)